Lioni is a town and comune in the province of Avellino, Campania, southern Italy.

Located in western Irpinia, in the Monti Picentini natural park, the municipality borders with Bagnoli Irpino, Calabritto, Caposele, Morra De Sanctis, Nusco, Sant'Angelo dei Lombardi and Teora.

History
The town's name appears for the first time in a donation dated 883, with which the Lombard prince Sichard granted the abbess of S. Sofia a property located in "Lions" (Lioni).

The ancient settlement was probably one of the smaller neighboring towns of Ferentino, a Samnite stronghold destroyed by the Romans during the wars between these two peoples.

The remains of Cyclopean walls typical of Samnite fortified villages were found on mount Oppido between Lioni and Caposele. The walls encompassed an area large enough to hold  houses, barns, and land for pasture.

Numerous clay fragments, primarily from tiles and pottery, were found inside the walled area of Oppido.  In addition, the town contains foundations of a large building whose layout resembles a medieval castle, and thus suggests continued use of the site in medieval times.

Twin towns
 Rome, Italy
 Sezze, Italy
 Piombino, Italy
 province of Arezzo, Italy
 province of Grosseto, Italy
 province of Pistoia, Italy
 province of Bergamo, Italy

See also
Irpinia
1980 Irpinia earthquake

References

External links

Official website 

Cities and towns in Campania